7796 Járacimrman is a dark Adeonian asteroid orbiting in the central region of the asteroid belt, approximately 11 kilometers in diameter. Discovered by Zdeněk Moravec at the Kleť Observatory in 1996, it was later named after Jára Cimrman, a Czech fictional character.

Discovery 

Járacimrman was discovered by Zdeněk Moravec at the Kleť Observatory in the Czech Republic, on 16 January 1996 and was initially designated . Observations continued until April 1996, and then again between June and July 1997. The asteroid was later determined to be a lost asteroid which had previously been observed twice: at the Brera-Merate Observatory in northern Italy on 12 December 1973, and at Mount Stromlo Observatory, near Canberra, Australia, on 8 and 9 July 1990.

Classification and orbit 

The asteroid is a member of the Adeona family, a large family of carbonaceous asteroids.

In 1997, Járacimrmans orbit was calculated more precisely by additional observatories and it could therefore be numbered as asteroid 7796, the 312th recognized (numbered) asteroid discovered at the Kleť Observatory. Moravec suggested naming it after the fictional Czech polymath Jára Cimrman.

Physical characteristics 

According to the survey carried out by NASA's Wide-field Infrared Survey Explorer with its subsequent NEOWISE mission, Járacimrman measures 11.312 kilometers in diameter and its surface has an albedo of 0.055, which is typical for carbonaceous C-type asteroids. However, no spectral data is available for the asteroid, thus neither its chemical nor mineralogical composition is currently known. In addition, no rotational lightcurve has been obtained of Járacimrman as of 2017.

Naming 

The citation accompanying the suggestion said: "Named for Jára Cimrman, a fictitious Czech genius. An analogue to Leonardo da Vinci, he was a playwright, composer, poet, painter, versatile scientist, inventor, polar explorer, sportsman, first man on the moon, etc. Although his name is not mentioned in any encyclopedia, his work is explored at the Jára Cimrman Theatre in Prague. This theatre is headed by the famous cimrmanologists Z. Svěrák and L. Smoljak, who endorsed the name proposal." The name was approved by International Astronomical Union (IAU) Committee on Small Body Nomenclature and published on 11 February 1998.

References

External links 
 7796 Járacimrman in Kleť minor planets database
 7796 Járacimrman, AstDys asteroid orbital elements database
 Asteroid Lightcurve Database (LCDB), query form (info )
 Dictionary of Minor Planet Names, Google books
 Asteroids and comets rotation curves, CdR – Observatoire de Genève, Raoul Behrend
 Discovery Circumstances: Numbered Minor Planets (5001)-(10000) – Minor Planet Center
 
 

007796
Discoveries by Zdeněk Moravec
Named minor planets
19960116